In molecular biology mir-25 microRNA is a short RNA molecule. MicroRNAs function to regulate the expression levels of other genes by several mechanisms. mir-25 levels increase in human heart failure, and treatment with an anti-sense RNA molecule (antagomiR) was recently reported to halt disease progression and improves cardiac function in a mouse heart failure model.

See also 
 MicroRNA

References

Further reading

External links 
 

MicroRNA
MicroRNA precursor families